Evius is a genus of moths in the family Erebidae. The genus was erected by Francis Walker in 1855.

Species
 Evius albicoxae (Schaus, 1905)
 Evius aurococcinea Walker, 1855
 Evius cochenouri Schaus, 1910
 Evius hippia (Stoll, 1790)
 Evius lobata (Dognin, 1911)
 Evius venusta (Dognin, 1924)

References

Phaegopterina
Moth genera